Under a Woodstock Moon is an album by saxophonist David Newman recorded in 1996 and released on Herbie Mann's Kokopelli label.

Reception

In his review for AllMusic, Scott Yanow states "Veteran David Newman is heard in fine form on his excellent CD, switching between tenor, alto and flute. He is joined by a supportive rhythm section and occasionally four strings for a cheerful set of ballads and originals. ... despite the mostly relaxed tempos, it is one of David Newman's stronger straight-ahead efforts and is easily recommended, particularly for Newman's appealing tenor playing".

Track listing 
All compositions by David Newman except where noted
 "Nature Boy" (eden ahbez) – 4:36
 "Amandla" – 5:15
 "Up Jumped Spring" (Freddie Hubbard) – 4:24
 "Spring Can Really Hang You up the Most" (Tommy Wolf, Fran Landesman) – 5:11
 "Autumn in New York" (Vernon Duke) – 4:38
 "Sky Blues" (David Leonhardt) – 2:56
 "Another Kentucky Sunset" (Leonhardt) – 4:58
 "Summertime" (George Gershwin, DuBose Heyward, Ira Gershwin) – 4:56
 "Sunrise" (Leonhardt, Newman) – 5:35
 "A Nightingale Sang in Berkeley Square" (Manning Sherwin, Eric Maschwitz) – 6:14	
 "Skylark" (Hoagy Carmichael, Johnny Mercer) – 4:49
 "Under a Woodstock Moon" – 5:32

Personnel 
David Newman – tenor saxophone, alto saxophone, flute
David Leonhardt – piano, arranger
Bryan Carrott – vibraphone 
Steve Novosel – bass 
Winard Harper – drums
String section conducted by Torrie Zito
Charles Libove, Eugene Moye, Matthew Raimondi, Ronald Carbone
Bob Freedman – arranger

References 

David "Fathead" Newman albums
1996 albums
Kokopelli Records albums